The 1923 U.S. National Championships (now known as the US Open) was a tennis tournament that took place on the outdoor grass courts at the Germantown Cricket Club in Philadelphia, Pennsylvania, United States. The women's tournament was held from 13 August until 18 August while the men's tournament ran from 10 September until 15 September. It was the 43rd staging of the U.S. National Championships and the third Grand Slam tennis event of the year.

Finals

Men's singles

 Bill Tilden defeated  Bill Johnston  6–4, 6–1, 6–4

Women's singles

 Helen Wills defeated  Molla Mallory  6–2, 6–1

Men's doubles
 Bill Tilden /  Brian Norton defeated  Richard Norris Williams /  Watson Washburn 3–6, 6–2, 6–3, 5–7, 6–2

Women's doubles
 Kitty McKane /  Phyllis Howkins Covell defeated  Hazel Hotchkiss Wightman /  Eleanor Goss 2–6, 6–2, 6–1

Mixed doubles
 Molla Mallory /  Bill Tilden defeated  Kitty McKane /  John Hawkes 6–3, 2–6, 10–8

References

External links
Official US Open website

 
U.S. National Championships
U.S. National Championships (tennis) by year
U.S. National Championships
U.S. National Championships
U.S. National Championships
U.S. National Championships
Sports competitions in Philadelphia